Moon Madness may refer to:
 Moon Madness (horse), a British Thoroughbred racehorse and sire
 The Secret of the Selenites, known as Moon Madness in the United States, a 1984 French animated comedy film
 Moon Madness (1920 film), an American silent drama film

See also
 Moonmadness, a 1976 album by Camel